Kimber is a surname and a given name.

People with the surname
Bobbie Kimber, English ventriloquist
Cecil Kimber
Chawne Kimber, African-American mathematician and quilter
Edward Kimber (1719–1769), English novelist, journalist, and compiler of reference works; son of Isaac Kimber
Glenn Kimber
Sir Henry Kimber, 1st Baronet
Isaac Kimber (1692–1755), English General Baptist minister, biographer, and journalist
René-Joseph Kimber
Sam Kimber
Simon Kimber
Sir Sidney Kimber
Wayne Kimber
William Kimber, English musician

People with the given name
Kimber Den
Kimber Gabryszak
Kimber Lee
Kimber Lockhart
Kimber Rickabaugh
Kimber Rozier
Kimber Sigler
Kimber West

Fictional characters
Billy Kimber, in the television series Peaky Blinders
Kimber Henry, in the American television series Nip/Tuck
Kimber Benton, in the animated television series Jem

See also
Kimber (disambiguation)
Kimberly (given name)
Kimberley (surname)

References